Lillington may refer to:

Places

England
 Lillington, Dorset, a hamlet in Dorset
 Lillington, Warwickshire, a suburb of Leamington Spa, Warwickshire
 Lillington Gardens, a housing estate in Pimlico, London

Elsewhere
 Lillington, North Carolina, a town in North Carolina, US

Other uses
 Karlin Lillington, technology journalist
 The Lillingtons, a punk rock band

See also 
 Litlington (disambiguation)